Linepithema is a genus of small ants in the subfamily Dolichoderinae.

Distribution

Their native distribution rage from northern Mexico, east into the Caribbean, and south into northern Argentina. Two species have been spread around the world by human activities: L. iniquum and L. humile. The latter is better known as the Argentine ant, an invasive species with notable presence in Mediterranean climates. Linepithema species are found from sea level and up to 4,000 meters above sea level in the Andes.

Species

Linepithema anathema 
Linepithema angulatum 
Linepithema aztecoides 
Linepithema cerradense 
Linepithema cryptobioticum 
Linepithema dispertitum 
Linepithema flavescens 
Linepithema fuscum 
Linepithema gallardoi 
Linepithema humile 
Linepithema inacatum 
Linepithema iniquum 
Linepithema keiteli 
Linepithema leucomelas 
Linepithema micans 
Linepithema neotropicum 
Linepithema oblongum 
Linepithema piliferum 
Linepithema pulex 
Linepithema tsachila

References

External links

Dolichoderinae
Ant genera
Hymenoptera of North America
Hymenoptera of South America